18th-century American piracy of British literature refers to the practice of reprinting British books in the United States without the permission of the original author or publisher.

Plagiarism is traditionally defined as “the process of copying another person's idea or written work and claiming it as original” This definition applies to many aspects of written work in today's world and has serious consequences if found guilty of committing it, but this idea has not always been in place. During the 18th century, it was extremely common for British Literature to be reprinted across the Atlantic Ocean in America without any acknowledgment or payment given to the original author. This form of plagiarism, referred to as literary piracy, was not an easy action to control because of the immense distance between the two countries, and the lack of any real international law which would work to protect the original authors in England. It was not until 1988 that these international laws were truly set in place and able to be enforced with any form of consistency.

Early piracy
Although it is now believed to be a crime, plagiarism has not always been considered a negative action. Thoughts, ideas, and writing were considered public property, not something an individual was able to claim as their own The ”borrowing” from others was thought of as a form of learning and was encouraged as an opportunity to enhance one's work. It was used as a stepping stone during the creative process. In order to create new stories, plots, and characters for a narrative, it was only natural for authors to look at what others before them had done. The difference between this recycling of ideas and copying is that an author will add original material to the inspiration, not simply recopy what came prior. Borrowing was deemed acceptable if it is only part of the final result and has a distinct twist from the original piece.  A prime example of accepted plagiarism can be found in Shakespeare, who “borrowed” from other authors and playwrights of his day in order to create almost all of his now famous plays. The term plagiarism originally comes from the Latin word for thief, in this case, a literary thief.

Establishment of copyright laws
London was the first city where authors were able to rightly protect themselves and their ideas after the first copyright law, known as the Statute of Anne,  passed in 1710. The specific purpose of this statute was “the encouragement of learned men to compose and write useful books”. This act not only protected authors in Britain, it also worked to protect the authors who had works being brought across the Atlantic to be reprinted without receiving any compensation for their literature. In 1880 the first international copyright laws were proposed by Mr. Edward Thorton in order to prevent this piracy from occurring and establishing consequences if it did (5). This treaty gave British authors protection in America and vice versa, allowing for consequences to follow the rules for the country of original publication. Pirated copies of novels and musical pieces were prohibited. It took over 100 years after these laws were proposed for the United States to fully cooperate with them.

International piracy
During the 18th century, the plagiarists and literary thieves (pirates) would bring British novels back to America, reprint them (with the original author's name in order to escape incrimination, but still using another author's work for their own personal gain), and yet never give the original author any compensation for their work. This system fell into place largely because the nation did not have any real individual literary identity at that point in time. During that period, the United States was still in the early stages of its independent development as a nation and most of what the new American public was comfortable with involved British culture and ideas. These pirated novels had already established a reputation and success in England and were therefore not a risk to publishers in the States, who already knew that there would likely be a success in the New World. In some cases, these pirated novels were more accessible in America than they were to the British where they were originally printed. Although novels were a large portion of the pirated works from England, magazines, and newspapers were included in the stolen works as well.

One primary example can be seen in Harper's New Monthly Magazine, a magazine that was aimed at women and attempted to create a patriotic attitude in the developing nation. Harper's ideas and strategies involved exposing these women to the British form of "elevated" culture in an effort to increase the standard and quality of the new American literature, which would result from the British inspiration they provided in their magazine. It was formerly believed that because of America's lack of a social class system, there would be no real need for a strong literary tradition. Harper's tried to expose the British tradition in order to facilitate growth for the American tradition. They sold for a low cost because there was no compensation being paid to the original authors back in England for the sole purpose of exposing every educated person in the new American public to "the unbounded treasures of the periodical literature of the present day".

The important thing was not the actual content of the magazines or their national origin but more about how much circulation and exposure these pieces received. This feeling of inspiration eventually backfired when the American authors were intimidated by the intense connection and dependence on British authors and did not produce many. Eventually, the resentment for the lack of Americanism led to a change in Harper's to include more national, not international, authors. This change never really paid off and the magazine did not see the same amount of success and profit that it received from the British pirated material.

Notes and references

Further reading
The International Copyright Union. Thorvald Solberg. The Yale Law Journal, Vol. 36, No. 1 (Nov., 1926), pp. 68–111. Published by: The Yale Law Journal Company, Inc.
Escaping from the Pirates: History, Literary Criticism, and American Copyright. Laura J. Murray. American Literary History 16.4 (2004) 719-727

Plagiarism
History of printing
18th century in the United States
Printing in the United States
British literature
United Kingdom–United States relations